In music, an antiphon is a responsory by a choir or congregation in Christian music.

Antiphon may also refer to:

People
Antiphon was a common personal name in Ancient Greece, with the result that it is not always easy for scholars to distinguish between different bearers of the name.
 Antiphon (orator) (480–411 BC), Athenian orator, one of the Ten Attic Orators and a significant political figure
 Antiphon the Sophist, the writer of the Sophistic works of Antiphon, believed by many scholars to have been Antiphon the Orator
 Antiphon, who wrote a treatise on the Interpretation of Dreams, possibly Antiphon the Sophist
 Antiphon (tragic poet) (died 411 BC), incorrectly confused with Antiphon the Orator by Plutarch and Philostratus
 Antiphon (epic poet), mentioned in the Suda
 Antiphon (brother of Plato), brother of the philosopher Plato
 Antiphon (arsonist) (died 342 BC), mentioned in a speech of the orator Demosthenes
 Antiphon (writer), author of a lost treatise on men distinguished for virtue

Other uses
 Antiphon (mythology), a comrade of Odysseus
 Antiphon (album), a 2013 album by Midlake
 The Antiphon, a 1958 play by Djuna Barnes

See also
 Antiphona, a Venezuelan mixed choir
 Antiphonary, a Catholic liturgical book
 Antiphonus, in Greek mythology, a son of King Priam of Troy